Princess Anne Robles (born June 7, 1999) is a Filipino volleyball player. She currently plays for the National University Lady Bulldogs in the UAAP women's volleyball tournaments.

Volleyball career 
Robles  currently plays for the National University in the UAAP.

In 2019, Robles won best Server in the UAAP Season 81 women's volleyball tournaments.

In 2022, Robles and her team National University won against De la Salle University and declared as champions in the UAAP Season 84 women's volleyball tournaments.

Princess Robles, and her teammates Jen Nierva, Ivy Lacsina, and Joyme Cagande will make their final appearance in the UAAP Season 85.

Clubs 
 BaliPure Purest Water Defenders - (2018)

Awards

Individual

Collegiate

References 

Filipino women's volleyball players
Living people
1997 births
Outside hitters